Willeya fusca is a species of saxicolous (rock-dwelling), crustose lichen in the family Verrucariaceae. Found in Vietnam, it was formally described as a new species in 2014 by Cécile Gueidan. The species epithet fusca refers to its characteristic dark brown areolate thallus, a feature that distinguishes it from other Willeya species.

References

Verrucariales
Lichen species
Lichens described in 2014
Lichens of Indo-China
Taxa named by Cécile Gueidan